A​​bdul-Malik Kashie Yoba (born September 17, 1967) is an American actor. He is known for his starring role as NYPD Detective J. C. Williams on the Fox police drama New York Undercover and as Yul Brenner in the film Cool Runnings. He appeared as former FBI Special Agent Bill Harken on the Syfy drama series Alphas, as Jim Hudson in Revolution, and as Vernon Turner in Empire. He also starred in the role of FBI Deputy Director Jason Atwood in the ABC political drama Designated Survivor. In 2018, he joined the Netflix drama Seven Seconds as a member of a support group for parents who had lost their children. He also appeared in Jordan Peele’s TBS comedy The Last OG with Tracy Morgan.

Early life 
The fourth of six children, Yoba was born in the Bronx, New York to Mahmoudah Young (née Lanier) and Abdullah Yoba.

Career 
In 1994, Yoba began his role on the popular FOX police drama series New York Undercover, opposite Michael DeLorenzo. Yoba and DeLorenzo made television history, as the series was the first police drama on American television to feature two people of color in the starring roles. Yoba's work on New York Undercover earned him three consecutive NAACP Image Awards for Outstanding Actor in a Drama Series (in 1996, 1997, and 1998).

An accomplished singer and stage actor, Yoba's talents were showcased in His Woman His Wife, in which he had the lead role.

Yoba has also appeared in films such as Cool Runnings and Criminal. He has made appearances on the FOX television series Arrested Development as Ice, a bounty hunter whose real love is party planning. Yoba had a recurring role as Brock Harris on the UPN sitcom Girlfriends. He also appeared in the FX Network's crime drama Thief and the NBC crime drama Raines. He appeared as Gavin in the 2007 Tyler Perry film Why Did I Get Married? and its 2010 sequel Why Did I Get Married Too? In 2009, he co-starred as astronaut Ted Shaw on the futuristic ABC drama Defying Gravity. In 2010, he announced his plans to bring back New York Undercover to the small screen in a modern TV series adaptation of the original series. Law & Order writer Courtney Parker penned a spec script for networks to bid on.

From 2011 to 2012, Yoba appeared as former FBI Special Agent Bill Harken on Alphas, a science fiction drama series about a team of people with special abilities who belong to a secret department attached to the DOD. In 2013, Yoba joined the cast of Revolution as Jim Hudson, a former captain of the Monroe Republic. In 2015, he joined the cast of Lee Daniels’ Empire as Vernon Turner, Lucious Lyon's business partner and chairman of Empire Entertainment, playing the character through the first season. In 2019, Yoba premiered his one-man stage play, Harlem to Hollywood, at New York’s Apollo Theater. The autobiographical show features Yoba performing original music and playing twenty different characters.

Other ventures 

In 2017, Yoba established his company Yoba Development, hoping to provide young people of color with access to the real estate industry. Yoba Development currently has active real estate projects in Baltimore and New York City. In 2019, he served as executive producer and director for The Real Estate Mixtape: Volume 1, I Build NY, a docu-series which follows Yoba as he navigates his first commercial real estate deal in NYC.

Personal life 

In 2019, Yoba took to social media to announce he would be a participant in the National Trans Visibility March in Washington, D.C., and publicly revealed he is attracted to pre-operative trans women, though he considers himself to be heterosexual. It has since been alleged by trans activist Mariah Lopez Ebony that Yoba engaged in inappropriate paid sexual activity with her when she was a minor. Though Yoba denies the allegation, as a result of the media storm regarding the controversial accusation, Yoba was removed from his position as spokesman for Phi Beta Sigma, which is focused on providing mentorship to "pre-teen and teen-aged males" through social, cultural and educational enrichment.

In the summer of 2021, Yoba underwent quadruple by-pass surgery as a result of hereditary heart disease. He is an advocate of plant-based nutrition and walking as medicine. In 2022, Yoba received an honorary Doctor of Humane Letters from Livingstone College in Salisbury, North Carolina. He currently works on his autobiography, From Harlem to Hollywood.

Filmography

Film 
A working actor since he made his debut, Yoba's film credits include: Cop Land, 'Til Death Do Us Part, Smoke, Blue in the Face, Soul Food, Ride, Bad Dad Rehab, and Betty & Coretta where he says he had the “great honor” of portraying Dr. Martin Luther King Jr., opposite Angela Bassett. International productions include the Danish film, Oh Happy Day, the BBC film Turks & Caico directed by David Hare and Take Point, a Korean action film for CJ Entertainment which was released worldwide in 2018.

Television
Yoba has been a guest on numerous talk shows, including The Oprah Winfrey Show, Inside the Actors Studio, The Wendy Williams Show, and Charlie Rose. He hosted TV One’s documentary crime series Justice By Any Means. Other series include Trinity and Kingpin. He has also had recurring roles on shows such as Single Ladies. Yoba has appeared in numerous guest-starring roles on Justified, Blue Bloods, Limitless, The Good Wife, Person of Interest, Law & Order and Nikita. He also appeared in God Friended Me on CBS and The First Wives Club on BET.

Video games

Awards and recognition 
American Black Film Festival- Winner, Best Documentary, 2016

NAACP Image Award- Winner, 1996,1997,1998

References

External links

1967 births
Living people
Male actors from New York City
African-American male actors
American male film actors
American male television actors
American people of Burkinabé descent
People from the Bronx
20th-century American male actors
21st-century American male actors
20th-century African-American people
21st-century African-American people